The Fâneața Vacilor is a left tributary of the Valea Racilor in Romania. It flows into the Valea Racilor in Turda.

References

Rivers of Romania
Rivers of Cluj County